Huangzhong District is a district of Xining, Qinghai Province, China. In 2020 the district had a population of 463,900, of which 153,000 belonging to minorities. The Kumbum Monastery (Ta'er Temple) is located in the district.

History 
Huangzhong has been inhabited since at least 4,000 years ago, as shown by archeological excavations in Lijiashan town. Later, the area belonged to the Qiang people. Since the capture of Xining by Emperor Wu of Han, Huangzhong has been part of the Chinese dynasties. The Han dynasty rulers established a county called Linqiang in the area, governed by Jincheng (Lanzhou). In 1943, the county seat was moved to Lushar town, and the county was named Huangzhong County, after the Huangshui river basin. In 2020 Huangzhong County was changed to Huangzhong District of Xining.

Administrative divisions 
Huangzhong governs over 10 towns, 5 townships and one subdistrict.
 Lushar town, county seat
 Kangchuan subdistrict
 Duoba town
 Shangxinzhuang town
 Tianjiazhai town
 Honghe town
 Lanlongkou town
 Ganhetan town
 Xibao town
 Lijiashan town
 Shangwuzhuang town
 Qunjia township
 Haizigou township
 Handong Hui Ethnic township
 Tumenguan township
 Dacai Hui Ethnic township

Climate

See also
List of administrative divisions of Qinghai

References

County-level divisions of Qinghai
Xining